The 1952 Philadelphia Eagles season was their 20th in the league. The team improved on their previous output of 4–8, winning seven games. The team failed to qualify for the playoffs for the third consecutive season.

Off season
Head coach Wayne Millner took over, for ailing head coach Bo McMillin in 1951, would resign on September 8, 3 weeks before the 1952 season started, citing health as the reason for stepping down.

NFL Draft
The 1952 NFL Draft was held on January 17, 1952. Picks made by New York Yanks were assigned to the new Dallas Texans franchise. There were 12 teams picking for 32 rounds.

The Eagles made the 4th pick in each round and made 31 picks in the 32 rounds they had picks in. The New York Yanks had the Eagles pick in the 5th round.

The Los Angeles Rams received this year's lottery bonus pick. The Rams used it to pick Bill Wade a quarterback out of Vanderbilt University. The Eagles used their number-4 pick in the 1st round to take Johnny Bright a back of Drake University. Johnny Bright, was chosen before fellow backs and future NFL Pro Football Hall of Fame members Frank Gifford from University of Southern California and Hugh McElhenny out of University of Washington, passed up playing for the Eagles. Bright later commented:

Player selections
The table shows the Eagles selections and what picks they had that were traded away and the team that ended up with that pick. It is possible the Eagles' pick ended up with this team via another team that the Eagles made a trade with. 
Not shown are acquired picks that the Eagles traded away.

Regular season

Schedule

Game recaps

Week 1: @ Pittsburgh Steelers

Week 2: vs New York Giants

Week 3: vs Pittsburgh Steelers

Week 4 vs Cleveland Browns

Week 5 at New York Giants

Week 6 at Green Bay Packers

Week 7 vs Washington Redskins

Week 8 vs Chicago Cardinals

Week 9 at Cleveland Browns

Week 10 at Chicago Cardinals

Week 11 vs Dallas Texans

Week 12 at Washington Redskins

Standings

Playoffs
With a record of 7–5, the Eagles fall one game back of Cleveland and failed to make the playoffs. The Detroit Lions and Los Angeles Rams would tie for the National Division title and had to play a Division Championship game before meeting Cleveland in the 1952 NFL Championship Game

Roster
(All time List of Philadelphia Eagles players in franchise history)

Postseason
At the end of the season, Bud Grant was offered a pay raise in his contract. He chose to play football in the CFL(Canadian Football League) instead. He had a career worthy of being named to the CFL's Hall of Fame as a player. Later on he made the Pro Football Hall of Fame as coach of the Minnesota Vikings.

Awards and honors
Pro Bowl Players 
 Chuck Bednarik and Pete Pihos both make the Pro Bowl 1st team.
 Russ Craft and  Bucko Kilroy selected to the Pro-Bowl team as back-ups.

League leaders
 Bud Grant finishes 2nd in receptions with 56.
 Bud Grant finishes 2nd in receiving yards with 997 yds.
 Adrian Burk leads league in number of punts with 83 and 40.2 yds avg
 Bobby Walston finishes 2nd with 11 field goals made.

References

Philadelphia Eagles seasons
Philadelphia Eagles
Philadelphia